Sceloporus scalaris, the light-bellied bunch grass lizard, is a species of small, phrynosomatid lizard.

Taxonomy
Currently, Sceloporus scalaris belongs in the scalaris group with a fluctuating number of other species. In 2010, Wiens et al. recognized the following species: Sceloporus aeneus, S. bicanthalis, S.chaneyi, S.goldmani, S. scalaris, and S. subniger while others such as Bryson et al. 2011 recognize: Sceloporus aeneus, S. bicanthalis, S.chaneyi, S.goldmani, S. samcolemani, S. scalaris, and S. slevini

Distribution
S. scalaris is widely distributed in Mexico, expanding northward from the Trans-Mexican Volcanic Belt to the southern United States of Arizona and New Mexico. The species is typically found in high elevation grasslands (1500 – 3000 m).

Description
Bunch grass lizards are typically grey in color, often with orange and yellow coloration around the neck and behind the forelimbs.  Males will have more of this vibrant coloration on their underside while female undersides tend to be white. Adults range from 52–62 mm snout-to-vent length (Ortega and Barbault, 1986).

Reproduction
Many species of Sceloporus are ovoviviparous including  the scalaris species. Juveniles are seen for the first time in late August (Ortega and Barbault, 1986).

References

Sceloporus
Reptiles of Mexico
Reptiles of the United States
Taxa named by Arend Friedrich August Wiegmann
Reptiles described in 1828
Fauna of the Sierra Madre Occidental